Andrew James Hartley (born 1964) is a British-born American novelist, who writes bestselling and award-winning fiction for children and adults. He also writes thrillers as Andrew Hart.

Works
The first of three middle grades and young adult adventures, Darwen Arkwright and the Peregrine Pact, was released from Razorbill (Penguin) in October 2011. In 2011, he co-authored with David Hewson a novelization of Shakespeare's Macbeth written specially for audio and released by Audible.com in June, narrated by Alan Cumming. His second collaboration with Hewson – an audio novel based on Hamlet, performed by Richard Armitage – was named Audible.com's best book of 2014 and was nominated for two Audie awards.

He is currently working with Tom DeLonge (of Angels and Airwaves and formerly Blink-182) on a novel series – Sekret Machines – released by DeLonge's To The Stars company in 2016. The series will have three books and a documentary film. The first book in the series, Chasing Shadows, was accompanied by a 4 track EP of the same name by Angels and Airwaves. Hartley is also writing a new Young Adult scifi series to be published by DeLonge's To The Stars Inc. and distributed by Simon and Schuster, called Cathedrals of Glass. The first book, Planet of Blood and Ice, was released in February 2017. A limited signed edition was released through To The Stars in November 2016 and sold out in 36 hours. With DeLonge's company partnered with Simon and Schuster, Hartley also writes the young adult sci-fi Cathedrals of Glass series.

June 2016 saw the release of the first of his new young adult series, SteepleJack, from Tor Teen. The book received several starred reviews from trade journals including Kirkus Reviews, Publishers Weekly and ALA Booklist. It was listed as one of Kirkus's Best Teen Books for 2016 and won both the Manly Wade Wellman and International Thriller Writers Awards.  It was followed by Firebrand in 2017 and Guardian in 2018.

Hartley made his UK debut in March 2018 with the publication of Cold Bath Street, a YA ghost story/thriller set in his home town of Preston, Lancashire. The book's title comes from a real street that once housed a public baths for poor Prestonians to bathe in, and is reputed to be haunted. Published by UCLan Publishing, the book was edited, designed, project-managed and produced by students on UCLan's MA Publishing course, the only student-run, student-led publishing house in the world. The book was long-listed for the Carnegie Medal and performed for audio by Christopher Eccleston. The same publisher will release Hartley's Darwen Arkwright series (renamed Monsters in the Mirror) in 2019. The sequel to Cold Bath Street was published in October 2019. Monsters in the Mirror, UK edition of Darwen Arkwright and the Peregrine Pact, was published on 1 March 2019.

His latest adult thrillers, authored under the pseudonym Andrew Hart, are Lies That Bind Us (2018) and The Woman in Our House (2019) from Lake Union Publishing.

In addition to the novels based on Shakespeare written with David Hewson, several of Hartley's audiobooks are voiced by celebrity actors including Noma Dumezweni (Steeplejack) and Christopher Eccleston (Cold Bath Street).

Personal life
Hartley was born in Preston, Lancashire. After his undergraduate degree he lived in Japan where he taught English for two years, travelling extensively throughout Asia. He then moved to the United States and obtained Masters and Doctoral degrees in English Literature from Boston University. He taught for nine years at the University of West Georgia and became the resident dramaturg for Georgia Shakespeare. At present he is the distinguished professor of Shakespeare in the Department of Theatre at the University of North Carolina at Charlotte. He is a theatre director and dramaturg, and for 10 years was the editor of the performance journal Shakespeare Bulletin, published by Johns Hopkins University press. He is the director of the Shakespeare in Action Center at UNC Charlotte.  His third novel, What Time Devours, draws on his experiences as an academic and centers on a lost Shakespeare play called Love's Labour's Won.

He studied Egyptology at Manchester University and worked just outside Jerusalem at a Bronze Age site. His mystery/thrillers, which have been USA Today and New York Times bestsellers, reflect this interest in the past, and particularly in the history of culture and ideas. Two of his principal characters are Deborah Miller, a Jewish museum curator who lives in Atlanta, and Thomas Knight, a high school English teacher from Evanston, Illinois. On April 30, 2019, he was on campus at UNC Charlotte when a gunman killed two students and wounded four others. Hartley took shelter with some students until the police declared the situation safe. He used this experience in his YA fantasy novel, Impervious, which was published the following year by Falstaff Books, a Charlotte publisher.

His Youtube channel includes videos on writing and walk-through analyses of songs by Japanese rock bands, notably BabyMetal.

He is married to a Japanese-American medical doctor whom he met when living in Japan, and they have one son.

Awards and honors

2001–2002 University of West Georgia Honors Professor of the Year
2012 SIBA Book Award (young adult) for Darwen Arkwright and the Peregrine Pact
2016 Named to Kirkus Best Teen Books of 2016 list for Steeplejack
2017 Named on the American Library Association's list of best young adult books for 2017 for Steeplejack 
2017 Winner of the Manly Wade Wellman Award for science fiction and fantasy, North Carolina, for Steeplejack
2017 Winner of the Thriller Award (young adult category) from International Thriller Writers, for Steeplejack
2018 Nominated for the Dragon Award (young adult category) for Cold Bath Street
2018 Long-listed for the Carnegie Medal for Cold Bath Street

Bibliography 

Academic Books
The Shakespearean Dramaturg: A Theoretical and Practical Guide, November 2005
Shakespeare and Political Theatre in Practice, January 2014
Shakespeare on the University Stage, December 2014
Julius Caesar (Shakespeare in Performance), April 2014
Julius Caesar: A Critical Reader, October 2016
Shakespeare and Millennial Fiction, January 2018

Adult Mystery/Thriller
The Mask Of Atreus, April 2006 (novel)
On the Fifth Day, July 2007 (novel)
What Time Devours, January 2009 (novel)
Tears of the Jaguar, September 2012

Adult Mystery/Thriller - Published under the pen name of Andrew Hart
Lies that Bind Us, June 2018, published by Lake Union Publishing
The Woman in Our House, June 2019, published by Lake Union Publishing

Alternative Detective
Steeplejack, June 2016
Firebrand, June 2017, part of the Steeplejack Saga
Guardian, June 2018, part of the Steeplejack Saga

Essays and Features
How I Got Published, featured, September 2007
How to Write Magical Words: A Writer's Companion, (with David B. Coe, Faith Hunter, Stuart Jaffe, Misty Massey, C.E. Murphy), January 2011
Thrillers: 100 Must-Reads, featured (page 11), January 2012

Historical Fiction
 Macbeth, a Novel, (with David Hewson) July 2010 as audiobook (narrated by Alan Cumming), spring 2011 print.' 
 Hamlet, Prince of Denmark, a Novel, (with David Hewson) May 2014 (narrated by Richard Armitage), fall 2014 print."
 Sekret Machines: Book 1 – Chasing Shadows, (with Tom DeLonge), April 2016
 Sekret Machines: Book 2 – A Fire Within, (with Tom DeLonge), September 2018

Middle grades Adventure
Darwen Arkwright and the Peregrine Pact, October 2011, part of Arkwright Saga
Darwen Arkwright and the Insidious Bleck, November 2012, part of Arkwright Saga
Darwen Arkwright and the School of Shadows, August 2013, part of Arkwright Saga
Monsters in the Mirror, UK edition of Darwen Arkwright and the Peregrine Pact, March 2019
The Mirrors Shattered: Beyond the Mirror, UK edition of Darwen Arkwright and the Insidious Black, August 2020.

Young Adult Fantasy
Act of Will, March 2009 (novel), part of Hawthorne Saga
Will Power, September 2010 (novel), part of Hawthorne Saga
The Cerulean Stone: A Will Hawthorne short story, May 2013
The Slave Trader's Wedding: A Will Hawthorne Short Story, June 2013
Cathedrals of Glass: Planet of Blood and Ice, February 2017
Cathedrals of Glass: Valkrys Wakes, January 2019
Cold Bath Street, April 2018, published by UCLan Publishing
Written Stone Lane, September 2019, published by UCLan Publishing
Impervious, April 2020, published by Falstaff Books

References

External links 
 
  on Fantasy Fan
 Magical Words, writers' blog
 

21st-century American novelists
American male novelists
Living people
1964 births
21st-century American male writers